Panthera blytheae is an extinct species of the genus Panthera that is thought to have existed during the late Messinian to early Zanclean ages approximately 5.95–4.1 million years ago. It is currently the oldest known Panthera species. The first fossils were excavated in August 2010 in the Zanda Basin located in the Ngari Prefecture on the Tibetan Plateau; they were described and named in 2014.

Characteristics 
Currently, only a single fossil specimen of a Panthera blytheae cranium has been found. However, current evidence shows that the species has a number of features common in other Panthera species, including a "frontoparietal suture located at the postorbital constriction", and an "absence of an anterior bulge overhanging the infraorbital canal". Its size is thought to be on par with that of the clouded leopard. It is about 10% smaller than the snow leopard. However, this is purely based on the relative sizes of the cranium, so this may be slightly inaccurate.

Relation to other Panthera species 
Some researchers questioned the classification of P. blytheae to the genus Panthera based on a limited comparisons to other species, and as lacking features that comply with Panthera features.

The closest extant relative of Panthera blytheae is the snow leopard. The evidence for this is that it is more similar in cranial structure to the snow leopard than to other pantherines, as well as two species having similar ranges spanning the Tibetan Plateau. Based on the age of the fossil, P. blytheae is believed to have been very similar in diet to the snow leopard, as many species that constitute a large part of the snow leopard's diet existed before the extinction of P. blytheae.
P. blytheae is not thought to be as closely related to the other extant species of the genus Panthera, and is therefore not believed to be the common ancestor of all pantherines. This implies that the divergence of Panthera from the rest of Felidae was much earlier, with current estimates being approximately 16.4 million years ago. Analysis of the location of P. blytheae in relation to other Panthera species indicates that Panthera arose in Central/Northern Asia or the Holarctic region of Asia, with other pantherines migrating to Europe, Africa and the Americas.

See also

Panthera atrox
Panthera gombaszoegensis
Panthera palaeosinensis
Panthera shawi
Panthera spelaea
Panthera youngi
Panthera zdanskyi

References

External links

blytheae
blytheae
Miocene felids
Pliocene carnivorans
Prehistoric animals of China
Miocene mammals of Asia
Pliocene mammals of Asia
Fossil taxa described in 2013
Messinian first appearances
Zanclean extinctions